Cemil Tosun  (born 6 February 1987 in Vienna) is an Austrian-Turkish footballer currently playing for Wiener SK.

References

External links
 Cemil Tosun im Rapidarchiv

1987 births
Living people
Austrian people of Turkish descent
Turkish footballers
Austrian footballers
Association football midfielders
Slovak Super Liga players
FC DAC 1904 Dunajská Streda players
Expatriate footballers in Slovakia
Footballers from Vienna
Austrian Football Bundesliga players